Giancarlo Cobelli (12 December 1929 – 16 March 2012) was an Italian actor and stage director. He was considered one of the most important directors of Italian theatre.

Early life
Born in Milan, Cobelli  studied acting at Giorgio Strehler's Piccolo Teatro, then obtained some success as actor and mime, on stage and on television.  Cobelli later was primarily active as theater director, especially devoting himself to operas alongside names such as Riccardo Muti, Roberto Abbado and Riccardo Chailly.

Career
He won several UBU Awards as best director.

References

External links 
 

Italian male film actors
1929 births
2012 deaths
Italian male stage actors
Italian theatre directors
Italian opera directors
Male actors from Milan
Italian mimes
Theatre people from Milan